The Dead River, found in Lake County, Florida, USA, serves as the division between the cities of Tavares and Leesburg. It received its name due to lack of a current. Studies have shown that a simple john boat can remain in nearly the same position if left on the river overnight with less than five feet of drift. The Dead River connects Lake Eustis and Lake Harris. The only roadway to cross the river is U.S. Highway 441/SR 44 near the river's northern mouth toward Lake Eustis. There are two businesses located directly on the river. Hurricanes Dockside Grill (2017) previously known as Dead River Vic's (1999), Harbor Side (2006), Nates River Deck (2008) and JJ Fin's (2009). Across Highway 441, opposite from Hurricanes Dockside Grill, there is a fish camp/restaurant named Palm Gardens.

For a historical look at Lake County waters, this was written in the 1930s:

On June 18, 2003, Brian Griffin, 12, was killed by a 10' 4" alligator while swimming in the Dead River near a boat ramp.

References
Excerpt from "Florida: The March of Progress" published circa 1930s by the Florida Department of Agriculture, Bureau of Immigration.

Rivers of Lake County, Florida
Rivers of Florida